Löwenkämpfer (The Lion Fighter) is an 1858 bronze equestrian statue by Albert Wolff, installed outside the Altes Museum in Berlin, Germany. An 1892 copy stands in front of the Philadelphia Museum of Art. The companion piece is Amazone zu Pferde, also installed outside the Altes Museum.

See also

 1858 in art

References

External links
 

1858 establishments in Germany
1858 sculptures
Bronze sculptures in Germany
Equestrian statues in Germany
Outdoor sculptures in Berlin
Sculptures of lions
Sculptures of men in Germany
Museum Island